Arab Encyclopedia is an encyclopedia in 24 volumes in the Arabic language. In 1953, Syria proposed the project to the Arab League who adopted a resolution to set up "The Arab Encyclopedia".  Another proposal for an "Arab Encyclopedia" was submitted to the Arab League in 1961. However, the project was not implemented for unidentified reason.  Syria adopted a resolution to establish the 'Institute of the Arab Encyclopedia' (IAE) in 1981 which issued the first edition of the encyclopedia in 1998 in Damascus, Syria.  In 2016, the official website was launched which allows free access to all the entries of the encyclopedia.

References

External links
Huruf Arabic Encyclopedia

Arabic-language encyclopedias
Syrian online encyclopedias
Arab encyclopedias
20th-century encyclopedias
21st-century encyclopedias
1998 non-fiction books